Kavli is a Norwegian food brand now owned by Kavli Trust.

Kavli may also refer to:

 Olav Kavli (1872–1958), Norwegian businessman who founded the Kavli company
 Fred Kavli (1927–2013), Norwegian-American businessman and philanthropist
Kavli Foundation (United States), supporting the advancement of science 
Kavli Prize
 Kavli Medal, two medals awarded biennially by the Royal Society
 Arne Kavli (1878–1970), a Norwegian painter
 Guthorm Kavli (1917–1995), a Norwegian architect and art historian
 Karin Kavli (1906–1990), a Swedish film actress

See also